Htun Wai (also spelt also Tun Wai; 23 October 1920–8 August 2005) is a three-time Myanmar Academy Award winning Burmese actor.

Htun won his first Myanmar Academy Award in 1957 with the film Bo Mya Din, achieved his second award in 1959 with the film Kagyi yae Ka and third award in 1983 with the film Tatiya arwale ei dutiya Waydanar .

Early life and education

He was born on 23 October 1920 in Nattalin, Pegu Division, British Burma (now Bago Region, Myanmar), the eldest of his siblings. His father is Kyaw Sein and mother is Shwe Yin.

Filmography
Son Bo Aung Din (1955)
Dr. Aung Kyaw Oo (1957)
Bo Mya Din (1957)
Ei Lu Baung Twin (1958)
Ka Gyi Yay Ka (1959)
Maung Mu Paing Shin (1964)
First Class (1966)
Hsaung (1966)
Mahuyar (1976)
Tatiya A Ywal Ei Dutiya Waydanar (1983)

Awards and nominations

Personal life
Htun first married Daw Saw. After the death of his wife, Daw Saw, he remarried his wife's niece, Daw Htwe Htwe. They have two sons.

Death
At Yankin Township, Yangon, Thiri Zeyar Road, he died at his home on August 8, 2005 at 1:25 am. He is survived by his wife, Daw Htwe Htwe, and children and his grandchildren.

References 

2005 deaths
1920 births
Burmese male film actors
People from Bago Region
20th-century Burmese male actors